Blaser or Bläser is a surname. Notable people with the surname include: 

Andrew Blaser (born 1989), American skeleton racer 
Cory Blaser (born 1981), American baseball umpire
Gustav Bläser (1813–1874), German sculptor
Josef Bläser (born 1952), German footballer
Martin J. Blaser (born 1948), American academic
Robert Blaser (born 1948), Swiss wrestler
Robin Blaser (1925–2009), American author and poet
Samuel Blaser (born 1981), Swiss trombonist and composer
William L. Blaser (1923–2018), American businessman and politician